The John B. Sollenberger Trophy is given to American Hockey League's leading scorer for the season.

History

The award was named for John B. Sollenberger in 1955.  Sollenberger was a long-time contributor to the league as manager and president of the Hershey Bears and former Chairman of the Board of Governors.  The award was originally named after Wally Kilrea, who held the AHL's single-season scoring record when the award was instituted 1947–48.  That season, the award was renamed in honour of its first recipient, Carl Liscombe, who broke Kilrea's scoring record.

Winners

References

External links
Official AHL website
AHL Hall of Fame
Historic standings and statistics - at Internet Hockey Database

American Hockey League trophies and awards